Die schwarzen Brüder is the best-known story of German-Swiss writers Lisa Tetzner and Kurt Held.

Plot introduction
The book was published in  two volumes between 1940 and 1941, and tells the fact-based story of Giorgio, a boy from Sonogno in the Verzasca Valley in the canton of Ticino in Switzerland. In historical chronicles, the author had read of a ferry disaster drowning some 30 chimney sweeps boys (Italian Spazzacamini). The boys were sold to the City of Milan for poverty in the middle of the 19th century.
The novel was started by Lisa Tetzner, and finished by her husband Kurt Held (actually Kurt Kläber), though the latter remained uncredited being a political refugee in Swirzerland to escape from Nazism. Kläber later published the novel Die Rote Zora und ihre Bande.

Plot
Giorgio grew up in the small Ticino mountain village Sonogno. His parents were poor mountain farmers. One day his mother broke her leg, Giorgio was sold as a boy chimney sweep to Milan, as the family had no money to pay for the medical treatment of his mother. A scar-faced man (referred to only as Der Mann mit der Narbe (The man with the Scar)), Antonio Luini, bought him for the sum of twenty Swiss Franks and gathered him and others to bring to Milan. During his journey to Milan, Giorgio met Alfredo, who came from a village in the Misox. The boat capsized, drowning many of the boys; only a few made their way to the lakeshore, where they were picked up by Luini and brought to Milan.

Giorgio was sold to Mr. Rossi, a chimney sweep in Milan, who was under the influence of his hard-hearted wife. Giorgio was humiliated by her son Anselmo and barely received enough to eat. Nicoletta, Rossi's deathly-sick daughter, helped Giorgio greatly, sharing her food and calming her mother.

Giorgio soon met with other chimney sweep boys, and was received in the community of "The Black Brothers". Together, they withstood the attacks from the local boys called Die Wölfe (The Wolves).

Malnutrition and hard work weakened Giorgio. While working in a clogged chimney, and breaking loose blocks of soot in the smoke of a fire still burning, he almost died. After falling and becoming unconscious, he was taken care of by a Ticino physician, Dr. Casella, who was attending a festivity at Mr. Rossi's house.  Dr. Casella later encouraged Giorgio and his friends to flee Milan and seek help at his estate in Lugano.

A few weeks later, Giorgio's friend Alfredo died of Pulmonary Tuberculosis. After his funeral, the two hostile groups of boys agreed to tolerate and to assist each other. When Anselmo accused Giorgio of stealing, the "Wolves" took Giorgio and his friends to the road that led to Switzerland. Giorgio was hunted by the Milan police, But the boys made their way to the neighboring Swiss border town of Lake Lugano. In Lugano, they met with Dr. Casella, who offered them accommodations in his house. Dr. Casella's influence also led to the arrest of Antonio Luini, after he had been identified by Giorgio. Luini was later sentenced to a long prison term.  

Nine years later, having become a teacher. Giorgio returned home to Sonogno together with his wife, Alfredo's sister Bianca. There, he reunited with Anita (who herself had married) and his entire family, including his father, mother and Nonna, who were all still alive and doing well.

Adaptations

Film
 2013 : , a Swiss-German movie directed by Xavier Koller.

Television
 1984 : Die schwarzen Brüder, a Swiss mini-series filmed by director .

Animated series
 In Japan in 1995, a 33-part animated series under the World Masterpiece Theater under the title Romeo no aoi sora was (Japanese ロミオ の 青い 空, Romio no aoi sora, literally: "Romeo's Blue Sky") directed by Kōzō Kusuba. Under the title Die schwarzen Brüder  this was also broadcast in Germany. For this telling of the story, Giorgio's name was changed to Romeo, it is his father who falls ill rather than his mother, and Romeo enters servitude voluntarily. Alfredo has an expanded role in the tale as a lost heir to nobility; and this (rather than the resolution of Luini) drives the plot in the last half of the series.

Radio play
Heidi and Stefan Knetsch Richwien adapted the material for the radio version. Christiane Ohaus directed. Produced by Radio Bremen, North German Radio and Bavarian Radio 2002nd The performers are: Raiko Kuester, Hildegard Krekel, Mendroch Horst, Ulrich and Andreas Pietschmann Pleitgen. In 2004, the radio play won the Quarterly Prize of the German Record Critics.
Lisa Tetzner: Die Schwarzen Brüder, Düsseldorf: Patmos 2003, 2 CDs, 104 min,

See also
Kaminfegerkinder
List of German television series
Romeo's Blue Skies

Publications in English
 The Black Brothers by Lisa Tetzner, Publisher: Highlights Press, 04/09/2004, Pages: 160., Ages young adult,

References

External links
 

1941 German-language novels
German children's literature
Child characters in literature
Fictional chimney sweepers
1984 German television series debuts
1941 children's books